Horst Fritz Otto Giese (31 January 1926 – 29 December 2008) was an East German actor.

Biography
In 1945, Giese made his debut on stage at his native Neuruppin, then in the Soviet occupation zone. Later he appeared on television. His first role in a movie was at the 1954 Alarm in the Circus (Alarm in Zirkus). He performed in some 50 films and television productions, and is known for his portrayals of Joseph Goebbels in several films, including in the five-part series Liberation, film Soldiers of Freedom, the two-part Bulgarian production Anvil or Hammer and in the Czechoslovak comedy Tomorrow I'll Wake Up and Scald Myself with Tea.

Giese had a long correspondence with actor Klaus Kinski, who has once visited him in East Berlin during 1956.

Shortly before the building of the Berlin Wall, Giese bought a West-German television device, and was arrested by the Stasi. To avoid punishment, he became an informant of the service. He was later accused of aiding the Stasi to arrest a man who helped residents of Berlin to flee to the west, who was subsequently imprisoned for 26 months.

At 1972, after an accident forced him to a long vacation, he started to write the radio drama The Extremely Peculiar Jazz Adventures of Mr. Lehmann (Die sehr merkwürdigen Jazzabenteuer des Herrn Lehmann), in which he voiced 28 different characters. He recorded and edited the entire series in his Babelsberg home, finally completing it in 1979. Due to technical difficulties, the Jazz Adventures was only broadcast in 1991, after the fall of the Wall. Giese received a prize from Germany's War Blind Union. He continued to produce three other radio dramas: The Extremely Peculiar Film Adventures of Mr. Lehmann, The Case of Leonardo and If Goebbels Would Have Gone to Japan.

Filmography

1954: Alarm in the Circus
1954: Stronger than the Night
1956: Thomas Müntzer - Bergknappe
1956: Those Days in Paris - Robert
1957: Duped Till Doomsday - Minor Role (uncredited)
1957: Rivals on the Steering Wheel
1959: Intrigue and Love - Rebell
1962: A Lively Christmas Eve - Giese
1963: Carbide and Sorrel
1964: Das Lied vom Trompeter - Arbeiter mit Binde
1968: The Banner of Krivoy Rog - Feldwebel
1970: The Case of Sergeant Grischa (TV Movie) - Schipper
1971: Rottenknechte (TV Mini-Series) - Müller
1971: KLK Calling PTZ - The Red Orchestra - Herr Schröder
1971: Liberation III: Direction of the Main Blow - Sapper Bruno Fermella / Joseph Goebbels
1972: Anvil or Hammer'''' - Reichsminister Joseph Goebbels
1972: Laut und leise ist die Liebe1972: Aus meiner Kindheit1976: Das Licht auf dem Galgen - Schneider
1977: Soldiers of Freedom (TV Mini-Series) - Joseph Goebbels (uncredited)
1977: Tomorrow I'll Wake Up and Scald Myself with Tea - Joseph Goebbels
1978: Eine Handvoll Hoffnung1978: Rotschlipse1978: Fleur Lafontaine - Füsilier Müller
1980: The Archive of Death (TV Series) - Unteroffizier Mantei
1980: Der Baulöwe1982: Front v tylu vraga - Joseph Goebbels
1983: The Turning Point - Deutscher Gefangener (uncredited)
1985: Half of Life1985: Pobeda1986: Wie die Alten sungen...'' - Straßenbahner

References

External links
Horst Giese on the American and German IMDb.
An obituary of Horst Giese.

1926 births
2008 deaths
People from Neuruppin
German male stage actors
German male television actors
German male film actors
People of the Stasi